Hypnotix, Inc. was an American video game developer that was founded in 1993 and located in Little Falls, New Jersey. The company's highest-profile games were its "Outlaw" series of sports titles, which included Outlaw Golf, Outlaw Volleyball, and Outlaw Tennis.  Hypnotix is also responsible for a wide variety of PC and console products including the Deer Avenger series, which has sold over a million copies.

In July 2005, the company was acquired by Electronic Arts and folded into EA Tiburon, which develops the Madden NFL and Tiger Woods PGA Tour series.

Games 
 Wetlands (1995)
 Soldier Boyz (1997)
 Deer Avenger (1998)
 Deer Avenger 2: Deer in the City (1999)
 Miss Spider's Tea Party (1999)
 Bass Avenger (2000)
 Deer Avenger 3D (2000)
 Who Wants to Beat Up a Millionaire? (2000)
 Panty Raider: From Here to Immaturity (2000)
 Daria's Inferno (2000)
 The $100,000 Pyramid (2001)
 Deer Avenger 4: The Rednecks Strike Back (2001)
 Deer Avenger: Open Season (2001)
 MTV Total Request Live Trivia (2001)
 Outlaw Golf (2002)
 Outlaw Golf: Holiday Golf (2002)
 Outlaw Volleyball (2003)
 9 Holes of Xmas: Outlaw Golf (2003)
 Outlaw Volleyball: Red Hot (2003)
 Math Missions: The Amazing Arcade Adventure (2003)
 BMX Trick Racer (2003)
 Dragon Tales: Learn & Fly With Dragons (2004)
 Outlaw Golf 2 (2004)
 Outlaw Tennis (2005)
 Outlaw Volleyball: Remixed (2005)

References

External links
Company page
Game Theory; On Deer Hunter's Trail, Rivals and a Spoof at The New York Times
Outlaw Golf Interview at IGN
Outlaw Volleyball Interview at TeamXbox

Electronic Arts
Companies based in Passaic County, New Jersey
Video game companies established in 1993
Video game companies disestablished in 2005
Defunct companies based in New Jersey
Defunct video game companies of the United States
Video game development companies